Bethel Christian School (BCS) is a private, Baptist, Toddler-8th Grade Christian school in Lancaster, California.

The school was established in 1979. At that time, the school, with 67 students and four teachers, used all of the facilities of the  church campus; the classrooms were initially located in Building 100. Building 200, the second phase of the school, was completed by September 1980. At that time the school had 150 students. The church and school also acquired additional modular buildings, allowing expansion. The first senior class, consisting of six students, graduated in June 1989. In the 1990s BCS grew to well over 600 students.

Bethel Christian School is accredited by the Association of Christian Schools International (ACSI), the Western Association of Schools and Colleges (WASC), and by the National Association for the Education of Young Children (NAEYC).

Campus
The property of the Bethel Church and School is on a  plot of land. As of 2012 Building 100 houses the administration. The school has  of classroom space, two playgrounds, one ball field, one gymnasium, multi-purpose facilities, and offices.

Notable alumni
 Erik Audé (class of 1998) - Actor, played high school football

References

External links

Bethel Christian School Website

Christian schools in California
Education in Lancaster, California
Private elementary schools in California
Private middle schools in California
Baptist schools in the United States
1979 establishments in California
Educational institutions established in 1979